Panos Koutrouboussis (1937 – 20 March 2019) was a Greek writer and artist. He studied film directing at the Centro Sperimentale di Cinematografia at Rome. He worked as an assistant director and assistant producer in Greek and foreign films, he illustrated book covers and record sleeves, and he also was a radio producer for the Greek Service of the BBC. He directed short silent films, and a documentary on bouzouki musicians and he was part of the editorial group for the periodical Pali (1964-1966).

Works

Short stories
Εν Αγκαλιά de Κρισγιαούρτι y otros Ταχυδράματα y Historias Περίεργες (In the Embrace of Krisyaourti, y Otros Tachydramas y Weird Historias), 1978
Στον Θάλαμο του Μυθογράφφ (In Mythograff's Chamber), 1992
Η Ταβέρνα του Ζολά (Zola's Taverna), 1997
Το Κεντράκι του Ταρζάν (Tarzan's Little Joint), 2005

Poetry
Η Εποχή των Ανακαλύψεων (The Age of Discoveries), 2002

Other
Τι Τρέχει; (WhazUp?), 2000
Εικόνες στην Aμμο + Ο Μπάροουζ στην Ουάσιγκτον (Images in the Sand + Burroughs in Washington), 2005

Notes

External links
His page at the website of the Hellenic Authors' Society (Greek) and (English)
IMDB listing (as Panagiotis Koutroubousis)

1937 births
2019 deaths
Greek novelists
Greek artists
21st-century Greek poets
People from Livadeia
Greek male poets
21st-century Greek male writers